Yerlan Serikzhanov (born 12 February 1995) is a Kazakhstani judoka. He competed in the men's 66 kg event at the 2020 Summer Olympics in Tokyo, Japan.

He participated at the 2018 World Judo Championships, winning a medal.

References

External links
 

1995 births
Living people
Kazakhstani male judoka
Judoka at the 2020 Summer Olympics
Olympic judoka of Kazakhstan
21st-century Kazakhstani people